St Mary the Virgin is a Church of England parish church in Henbury, Bristol, England.

There may have been a church on the site since the 7th century. Construction of the present building took place during the 13th century. Restoration work was later carried out in the 19th century by the Gothic Revival architects Thomas Rickman and George Edmund Street. The church has been designated by English Heritage as a grade II* listed building.

History 

The first church on the site probably dates to around AD 691–92, when King Æthelred of Mercia made a grant of land to Oftfor, Bishop of Worcester. Around 1093 a charter of another Bishop of Worcester, Wulfstan, endowed the Henbury church and all of its tithes to Westbury on Trym's monastery, which Wulfstan had acquired for the Worcester diocese around that time.

When the monastery became Westbury College around 1194, the area around Henbury became a prebend of the college. The tithes from Henbury provided a revenue for one of the college's canons, who was responsible for providing the vicar for St Mary's. In addition, the Henbury church was the other church, alongside Holy Trinity Church, Westbury on Trym, whose maintenance was a collective responsibility of the college community.

The college periodically received supervisory visits from the Worcester diocese, with a bishop's palace in Henbury used as an episcopal residence until the late 15th century. This was situated somewhere close to St Mary's, though its exact location is not certain.

When Westbury College was dissolved in 1544, St Mary's became a parish church of the new Bristol diocese.

Archives
Parish records for St Mary's church, Henbury, Bristol are held at Bristol Archives (Ref. P.Hen) (online catalogue) including baptism, marriage and burial registers. The archive also includes records of the incumbent, churchwardens, overseers of the poor, parochial church council, charities, schools and societies plus deeds, plans and photographs.

Architecture 

The nave and lower tower date from around 1200. In the early 13th century the upper tower, chancel and south chapel were added, and the clerestory was built around 1300. These features are in the Early English style, although with some restoration since. Most notable are the Late Norman doorways, which have segmental arches.

In 1836 Thomas Rickman built the north chapel and carried out restoration work, and the church was further restored by George Edmund Street in 1875–77. The 19th century restorations introduced Perpendicular Gothic Revival style features, in particular the windows for the nave and the chapels.

In the churchyard there is a mortuary chapel which was built around 1830, and may also have been designed by Rickman. It is in the Early English Gothic Revival style and has been designated by English Heritage as grade II listed.

Memorials 

The slave known as Scipio Africanus is buried in the churchyard in a grave with elaborately painted headstone and footstone, dated 1720. It is grade II* listed.

An obelisk with a stone ankh marks the grave of the Egyptologist Amelia Edwards. She is buried alongside her companion, Ellen Drew Braysher, with whom she had lived in Westbury on Trym, and Braysher's daughter, Sarah Harriet. In September 2016, Historic England designated the grave as grade II listed, celebrating it as a landmark in English LGBT history.

The churchyard also contains the grave of Philip Napier Miles, the philanthropic last "squire" of King's Weston, who died in 1935.

There are war graves in both the church's churchyard extension and its detached church cemetery. The former holds the graves of three soldiers of the First World War and one of the Second World War, the latter those of four soldiers and a Royal Air Force officer of the Second World War.

See also 
 Churches in Bristol
 Grade II* listed buildings in Bristol

References

External links 
 St Mary's Henbury

13th-century church buildings in England
Church of England church buildings in Bristol
Diocese of Bristol
Grade II* listed churches in Bristol
Thomas Rickman buildings
G. E. Street buildings
Henbury